Mohammed Qasim (born 3 August 1991) is a Pakistani-born cricketer who played for the United Arab Emirates national cricket team. He made his first-class debut for the United Arab Emirates against Scotland in the 2015–17 ICC Intercontinental Cup on 9 August 2016. On 20 September 2016 he scored the most runs for the Emirates Cricket Board XI team against the West Indies in a T20 tour match. He made his List A debut for United Arab Emirates in their three-match series against Oman in October 2016.

He made his Twenty20 International (T20I) debut for the United Arab Emirates against Afghanistan on 14 December 2016. He made his One Day International (ODI) debut for the United Arab Emirates against Scotland on 24 January 2017.

References

External links
 

1991 births
Living people
Emirati cricketers
United Arab Emirates One Day International cricketers
United Arab Emirates Twenty20 International cricketers
Cricketers from Sialkot
Pakistani emigrants to the United Arab Emirates
Pakistani expatriate sportspeople in the United Arab Emirates